Maria Barbara Amaro (born 7 February 1986) is a water polo player from Brazil.

She played with the Brazil women's national water polo team at the  2011 World Aquatics Championships.

She played for the University of Hawaii.

References

External links

1986 births
Living people
Brazilian female water polo players